Kwamankese is a town in the Central Region of Ghana. The town is located in the Abura-Asebu-Kwamankese municipality.

References 

Populated places in the Central Region (Ghana)